Lira is a common surname in the Portuguese, Spanish and Italian languages. It was also a given name during the Medieval period. Lira translates to libra in Latin, which means "balance".

Notable people with the surname include:

 Aílton Lira (born 1951), Brazilian footballer
 Felipe Lira (born 1972), Venezuelan baseball player
 Johnny Lira (1951–2012), American weightlifter
 José López Lira (1892–1965), Mexican lawyer and politician
 Juan Enrique Lira (1927–2007), Chilean sport shooter
 Gonzalo Lira (born 1968), Chilean-American novelist
 Michael Lira (born 1975), Australian composer
 Michael Lira (racing driver) (born 1997), American racing driver
 Osvaldo Lira (1904–1996), Chilean priest, theologian and philosopher
 Patricio Lira, Chilean footballer
 Pedro Lira (1845–1912), Chilean painter and art critic
 Pedro Reginaldo Lira (1915–2012), Argentine Catholic bishop
 Raimundo Lira (born 1943), Brazilian politician
 Sergio A. Lira, Brazilian-American immunologist
 Wendell Lira (born 1989), Brazilian footballer
 Yadira Lira (born 1973), Mexican karateka

Surnames

lira is also a first name that has two meanings: balance and harp depending on the name's spelling